The Queen of the Landstrasse (German: Königin der Landstrasse) is a 1948 Austrian romance film directed by Géza von Cziffra and starring Angelika Hauff, Rudolf Prack and Hermann Erhardt. The film's sets were designed by art director Fritz Jüptner-Jonstorff.

Cast
 Angelika Hauff as Flora Giebel genannt "Lulu"  
 Rudolf Prack as Michael von Dornberg  
 Hermann Erhardt as Johannes Giebel  
 Ditta Donnah as Nellie Giebel  
 Albin Skoda as Alfredo  
 Karl Skraup as Niko  
 Dagny Servaes as Regina von Dornberg, Michaels Tante 
 Karl Günther 
 Petra Trautmann as Gaby

References

Bibliography 
 Robert Dassanowsky. Austrian Cinema: A History. McFarland, 2005.

External links 
 

1948 films
1940s romance films
Austrian romance films
1940s German-language films
Films directed by Géza von Cziffra
Circus films
Films set in the 1920s
Austrian black-and-white films